Ed Charbonneau has been a Republican member of the Indiana Senate since 2007.

Education
Charbonneau attended Wabash College, Loyola University Chicago, and South Texas College of Law. He served in the United States Army Reserve from 1966-1972.

Senate
Charbonneau has represented the 5th district since 2007. The district includes most of Starke County and portions of Porter, LaPorte, Marshall, Jasper, Pulaski and St. Joseph.

Personal
He is married with two children and seven grandchildren.

References

External links
 Ed Charbonneau at Ballotpedia
 official Indiana State Legislature site

Year of birth missing (living people)
Living people
Indiana lawyers
Republican Party Indiana state senators
Loyola University Chicago alumni
South Texas College of Law alumni
Wabash College alumni
21st-century American politicians